The Bayamon Wolfpack are a semi-pro Puerto Rican football team based in Bayamon, Puerto Rico, competing in the Puerto Rico American Football League (PRAFL).

History

Club culture

Bayamon Wolfpack

AFAPR Sub-23
It is the club's U-23 team that participates in the American Football League of Puerto Rico 2nd division of Puerto Rican American football league, its goal is to develop players with potential so that they can eventually make the jump to either the PRAFL team.

Players and Staff

Management
  Zesar Zorba - President, Head Coach

Record

Year-by-year

References

Puerto Rico American Football League teams
Sports in Bayamón, Puerto Rico